Mark Jeffrey (or "Big Mark") (1825–1894) was an English convict who departed England on 12 December 1849 and arrived in Australia on 30 April 1850. Mark Jeffrey was described as "A terror to those in authority. He always fought against injustice...".
His father, John, worked for a doctor and when the doctor died John was left with nowhere to live and no money which compelled him to become an alcoholic. Mark and his younger brother Luke then took to burglary to escape their father who severely beat them.
Mark and Luke made a fairly good sum out of burglary but it was at their fifteenth burglary that they were caught and sentenced to fifteen years' transportation to a penal colony despite conflicting evidence which was resolved by a man named John Hart. Mark then attempted to attack Hart in the courtroom before being restrained.
While awaiting transportation, Mark and his brother were sent to Millbank Prison where he again met John Hart. It was then that Jeffrey's temper arose and he spoke to Hart in such a manner that caused him to die of a heart attack without Jeffrey physically touching him. Jeffrey was charged with manslaughter but the charges were then dropped because of his arguments that Hart brought it upon himself. While in Millbank Prison, Jeffrey was in many disputes over his rights to food and rations but it was while awaiting transportation working in dockyards that Jeffrey found himself being severely punished after his lack of rations resulted in his violent attacks. Jeffrey became so depressed that he pleaded with the authorities to be executed but they had a different punishment in mind.
After a long and stormy voyage on the ship Elisa, Jeffrey worked torturously on Norfolk Island (an island off NSW between Australia, NZ and New Caledonia) before being sent to Separate Prison in Port Arthur for six months over more controversy over provisions. In 1866 Jeffrey was a free man but was unable to work because of an injury in his legs so Jeffrey was sentenced back to Separate Prison as an "Invalid". In 1870, Jeffrey was freed again but shortly after he was involved in a fight in a pub and convicted of manslaughter sentencing him back into the prison in Port Arthur for life. Jeffrey spent extensive periods at a time in solitary imprisonment wearing leg-irons giving shooting pain and ulcers all over his legs. Jeffrey saw this as an injustice so he wrecked and smashed his prison cell and attempted to murder the doctor looking after him. The authorities at the time were exhausted by his violent outbursts and sent him to the Isle of the Dead as a grave digger. It was there that it is thought Jeffrey dug his own grave which he tended, carefully patting down the sides to stop worms from invading the grave.
While living on the Isle of the Dead Jeffrey encountered a terrifying experience. He was in his hut when the Devil (or "His Satanic Majesty" as Jeffrey referred to him as) supposedly appeared and spoke to him. Jeffrey was so disturbed by the experience that he immediately requested to be removed from the island.
Jeffrey was then sent to Hobart in 1877 where he continually fell victim to injustice and found himself several more convictions of assault. Jeffrey was then transferred to the Invalid Depot at Launceston, Tasmania where he again earned his freedom.
Jeffrey became deeply religious and self-aware of his temper. Mark Jeffrey wrote an autobiography titled "A Burglar's Life", where he talked about a deep humiliation about his wasted life and hoped to "...Enter thou into the joy of the Lord."

Mark Jeffrey died in 1894 at the age of 68.
Until recently, it was believed he died and was buried in Launceston, but it seems that his final resting place, according to Southern Cemeteries records, is in Hobart Cornelian Bay Cemetery Site No. 516.
His record of death in the Deaths of the District of Hobart lists him as:
No 1216 Died 17 July 1894 in Newtown aged 68 years, Pauper, Of Peritonitis, Tumour of the Heart.
One of the reasons that confusion may have occurred was that his death was reported in the Launceston Examiner Thursday 19 July 1894, page 6.

References
 
 

1825 births
1903 deaths
Convicts transported to Australia